USS Delbert D. Black (DDG-119) is an  of the United States Navy.

Etymology
She is named in honor of Master Chief Petty Officer Delbert Black, the first Master Chief Petty Officer of the Navy (MCPON), who died in 2000. He is remembered for establishing the role of the Navy's senior enlisted leader, and the ship naming is the culmination of a decade of advocacy by MCPONs to honor him with a combatant ship.

History
Delbert D. Black was launched on 8 September 2017. On 29 March 2019, the ship was damaged at the shipyard when a heavy-lift ship collided with a barge that was alongside the Delbert D. Black. The barge in turn struck the destroyer, resulting in several workers sustaining minor injuries and causing significant damage to the destroyer. The superstructure and hull were both breached and substantial internal spaces were flooded. Damages were estimated to be approximately $10–15 million USD. On 12 March 2020, the ship successfully completed acceptance trials, after spending two days at sea in the Gulf of Mexico.

Delbert D. Black left Mayport on 2 August 2022 for her maiden deployment as part of Carrier Strike Group 10.

On 29 September 2022, Delbert D. Black seized 7200 kilograms of hashish in the Gulf of Oman.

References

External links
 
 
 USS Delbert D. Black Commissioning Site

 

Arleigh Burke-class destroyers
2017 ships